Eliezer ben Hurcanus or Hyrcanus was one of the most prominent Sages (tannaim) of the 1st and 2nd centuries in Judea, disciple of Rabban Yohanan ben Zakkai and colleague of Gamaliel II (whose sister Ima Shalom he married), and of Joshua ben Hananiah. He is the sixth most frequently mentioned sage in the Mishnah.

Biography

Introduction to Torah 

He was a kohen. His earlier years are wrapped in myths, but from these it may be inferred that he was somewhat advanced in life when a desire for learning first seized him, and impelled him, contrary to the wishes of his father, to desert his regular occupation and to depart to Jerusalem to devote himself to the study of the Torah. Here he entered Rabban Yochanan ben Zakkai's academy and for years studied diligently, despite having to cope with great privations. It is said that sometimes many days elapsed during which he did not have a single meal. Ben-Zakkai, recognizing Eliezer's receptive and retentive mind, styled him "a plastered cistern that loses not a drop, even a cask coated with pitch that preserves its wine." These endowments were so pronounced in him that in later years he could declare, "I have never taught anything which I had not learned from my masters."

His father in the meantime determined to disinherit him, and with that purpose in view went to Jerusalem, there to declare his will before Rabbi Yochanan ben Zakkai. Ben Zakkai, having heard of Hyrcanus' arrival and of the purpose of his visit, instructed the usher to reserve for Hyrcanus a seat among those to be occupied by the elite of the city, and appointed Eliezer lecturer for that day. At first the latter hesitated to venture in Ben Zakkai's place, but, pressed by the master and encouraged by his friends, delivered a discourse, gradually displaying wonderful knowledge. Hyrcanus having recognized in the lecturer his truant son, and hearing the praises which Ben-Zakkai showered on him, now desired to transfer all his earthly possessions to Eliezer. But Eliezer, overjoyed at the reconciliation, declined to take advantage of his brothers, and requested to be allowed to have only his proportionate share. He continued his attendance at Ben-Zakkai's college until near the close of the siege of Jerusalem, when he and Joshua assisted in smuggling their master out of the city and into the Roman camp.

Subsequently, Eliezer proceeded to Yavne, where he later became a member of the Sanhedrin under the presidency of Gamaliel II, though he had established, and for many years afterward conducted, his own academy at Lydda. His fame as a great scholar had in the meantime spread, Rabban Yochanan ben Zakkai himself declaring that Eliezer was unequaled as an expositor of traditional law; and many promising students, among them Akiva, attached themselves to his school.

Eliezer became known as "Eliezer ha-Gadol" ("the Great"; generally, however, he is styled simply "R. Eliezer"), and with reference to his legal acumen and judicial impartiality, the Scriptural saying "That which is altogether just [literally "Justice, justice"] shalt thou follow," was thus explained: "Seek a reliable court: go after R. Eliezer to Lod, or after Yohanan ben Zakkai to Beror Ḥayil," etc. Once he accompanied Gamaliel and Joshua on an embassy to Rome.

Eliezer's conservatism 
Rabbi Eliezer was very severe and somewhat domineering with his pupils and colleagues, a characteristic which led occasionally to unpleasant encounters. The main feature of his teaching was a strict devotion to tradition: he objected to allowing the Midrash or the paraphrastic interpretation to pass as authority for religious practice. In this respect he sympathized with the conservative school of Shammai, which was also opposed to giving too much scope to the interpretation. Hence the assertion that he was a disciple of the School of Shammai, though he was a disciple of Rabban Yohanan ben Zakkai, who was one of Hillel the Elder's most prominent pupils.

Eliezer's conservatism brought him into conflict with his colleagues and contemporaries, who realized that such conservatism must be fatal to a proper development of the oral law. It was also felt that the new circumstances, such as the destruction of the Temple and the disappearance of the national independence, required a strong religious central authority, to which individual opinion must yield.

At last the rupture came. The Sanhedrin deliberated on the susceptibility to Levitical uncleanness of an akhnai-oven. The majority decided that such an oven was capable of becoming unclean, but Eliezer dissented. As he thus acted in direct opposition to the decision of the majority (though, according to the Talmud, a heavenly voice, a tree, a nearby stream, and the walls of the house of study all agreed with Eliezer's interpretation), it was deemed necessary to make an example of him, and he was excommunicated. Rabbi Akiva, dressed in mourning, appeared before him and, seated at some distance from him, respectfully addressed him with "My master, it appears to me that thy colleagues keep aloof from thee." Eliezer readily took in the situation and submitted to the sentence. According to the Talmud, because Akiva broke the news gently, Eliezer (who had the power to destroy the world) annihilated no more than one-third of crops worldwide and burned only those things that were within his field of view; the tsunami that Eliezer raised that day was easily calmed by Rabbi Gamaliel.<ref>Bava Metzia 59b; Jerusalem Talmud Mo'ed Katan' 3 (81a+)</ref> Thenceforth Eliezer lived in retirement, removed from the center of Jewish learning, though occasionally some of his disciples visited him and informed him of the transactions of the Sanhedrin.

Judah haNasi, chief redactor and editor of the Mishnah, ruled that halacha is in accordance with Rabbi Eliezer but felt that, due to his unpopularity, he could only relay over Rabbi Eliezer's rulings in the name of the sages.

 Roman charge of heresy 
Rabbinic accounts in the Tosefta, the Babylonian Talmud, and the Kohelet Rabba all relate that Eliezer was arrested for "heresy" after agreeing with a religious teaching proposed by a man named Yaakov who was a follower of Yeshua (often seen as Jesus). Scholars connect this arrest and subsequent trial with the persecution of Christians by Roman authorities as demonstrated in the letters between the Emperor Trajan and Pliny the Younger. That is, the Romans apparently arrested Eliezer under the charge of being a Christian,  not understanding that he was actually a prominent Jewish scholar; a pagan may have denounced him as a Christian in a deliberate attempt to sow discord in the Jewish community. According to Pliny, Christians who refused to recant their Christian belief were executed; Christians who recanted their beliefs and prayed to Roman gods had their charges dismissed. Eliezer was neither a Christian nor a pagan, and he had his charges dismissed apparently by making an ambiguous statement that the Roman judge understood as acknowledging Roman authority but which Eliezer understood as acknowledging the authority of the Jewish God.

The rabbinic accounts don't reference the wider context of Roman persecution of Christians, and instead focus on specific points of Jewish halakha. The accounts state that Eliezer was charged for being a heretic, and was summoned before the penal tribunal. Being asked by the Roman governor, "How can a great man like you engage in such idle things?" he simply replied, "Blessed is the True Judge".  The judge, thinking that Rabbi Eliezer was speaking about him, released him, while Rabbi Eliezer understood by "judge" God, justifying the judgment of God which had brought this trial upon him. That he should be suspected of apostasy grieved him sorely, and though some of his pupils tried to comfort him, he remained for some time inconsolable. At last he remembered that once, while on a road of Sepphoris, he had met a follow of Jesus, Yaakov of Kfar Sikhnin who communicated to him a singular halakhah in the name of Yeshua ben Pantiri/Yeshu ha-notsri, that he had approved of the halakhah and had really enjoyed hearing it. It was for this, he reflected, that he was arrested for heresy, for transgressing the teachings of the Torah or (in another variant at Midrash Haggadol on Deut.23:19) his fellows. He specified what injunction had been broken citing: 'Remove thy way far from her, and come not nigh the door of her house,'Joshua Schwartz, Peter J. Tomson,'When Rabbi Eliezer was arrested for heresy,' Jewish Studies, an Internet Journal 2012, vol.10, pp.1-37, pp.6-7. which the Rabbis apply to sectarianism as well as to heresy".Ecclesiastes Rabbah 1:8 The suspicion of apostasy and the summons before the dreaded tribunal came, therefore, as just punishment. This event in his life may have suggested to him the ethical rule, "Keep away from what is indecent and from that which appears to be indecent". It is suggested that his sayings, "Instructing a woman in the Law is like teaching her blasphemy", "Let the Law be burned rather than entrusted to a woman", and "A woman's wisdom is limited to the handling of the distaff", also dated from that time, he having noticed that women were easily swayed in matters of faith.

Censured
Separated from his colleagues and excluded from the deliberations of the Sanhedrin, Eliezer passed his last years of life unnoticed and in comparative solitude. It is probably from this melancholy period that his aphorism dates:

When asked how one can determine the one day before his death, he answered: "So much the more must one repent daily, lest he die tomorrow; and it follows that he must spend all his days in piety".

 His death 

When his former colleagues heard of his approaching death, the most prominent among them hastened to his bedside at Caesarea. When they appeared before him he began to complain about his long isolation. They tried to mollify him by professing great and unabated respect for him, and by averring that it was only the lack of opportunity that had kept them away. He felt that they might have profited by his teaching. Thereupon they besought him to communicate to them laws concerning certain points, particularly touching Levitical purity and impurity. He consented, and answered question after question until his breath left him. The last word he uttered was "tahor" ("pure"), and this the sages considered as an auspicious omen of his purity, whereupon they all tore their garments in token of mourning, and Joshua ben Hananiah revoked the sentence of excommunication.

Eliezer died on a Friday, and after the following Sabbath his remains were solemnly conveyed to Lydda, where he had formerly conducted his academy, and there he was buried. Many and earnest were the eulogies pronounced over his bier. R. Joshua is said to have kissed the stone on which Eliezer used to sit while instructing his pupils, and to have remarked, "This stone represents Sinai, and he who sat on it represented the Ark of the Covenant". R. Akiva applied to Eliezer the terms which Elisha had applied to Elijah, and which Joash subsequently applied to Elisha himself, "O my father, my father, the chariot of Israel, and the horsemen thereof".

 Quotes 
Though excommunicated, Rabbi Eliezer is quoted in the Mishnah, the Baraita, and the Talmud more frequently than any one of his colleagues. The 8th or 9th century pseudographical work known as The Ethics of Rabbi Eliezer'' also claims to include his teaching.

Anyone who has bread in his basket and asks, 'what shall I eat to-morrow,' belongs to those of little faith.

Be particularly careful about the honour due to your fellow man, and prevent your children from [relying on] logic [when studying verses that tend toward heresy], and have them seated between the knees of the disciples of the Sages, and whenever you [stand up to] pray, be apprised of whom it is you are standing before, on which account you shall be merited to obtain life in the world to come.

It was not in vain that the starling went off with the raven. Rather, it goes to show that it is one of their kind! (i.e. a person is known by whom he associates with)

Burial place
He is buried in HaRambam compound / complex in Tiberias / Tveria.

Other notable rabbis also buried in HaRambam compound / complex:
 Shelah HaKadosh
 Maimonides
 Yohanan ben Zakkai
 Joshua ben Hananiah

References 

1st-century rabbis
2nd-century rabbis
Baalei teshuva
Mishnah rabbis
People from Lod
Pirkei Avot rabbis